Eurata minerva is a moth of the subfamily Arctiinae. It was described by Schaus in 1901. It is found in Brazil (Parana).

References

 Natural History Museum Lepidoptera generic names catalog

Arctiinae
Moths described in 1901